Luther C. Dodge (September 7, 1821 – February 3, 1901) was a businessman, politician, and government official who was active in Vermont and California.  A Republican, he was most notable for serving as mayor of Burlington, Vermont from 1871 to 1874.

Biography
Luther Collamer Dodge was born in Montpelier, Vermont on September 7, 1821, a son of Nathan and Hannah (Phinney) Dodge.  He was educated in Montpelier and farmed until 1841, when he moved to Burlington, Vermont to become a clerk in the J. & J. H. Peck Company wholesale mercantile business.  In 1847 he joined the Troy and Canada Junction Telegraph Company as an operator.  In 1848, Dodge became the company's superintendent, a position he held until 1853.

In September 1855, Dodge moved to San Francisco, California, where he was a partner with his brother Henry L. Dodge and others in a wholesale mercantile business.  He later operated a wholesale business in Petaluma, California in partnership with William Hill.  In 1868, Dodge returned to Burlington, where he resided until 1877.  Dodge's brother Omri was president of Burlington's First National Bank, and Luther Dodge served as the bank's cashier.  In addition to his banking career, Dodge was involved with several Burlington civic causes, including serving as an officer of the Young Men's Association, a captain in a volunteer fire company, and a member of the city's Board of Trade.  A Republican, he was elected mayor in 1871, and served until 1874.  Among the highlights of Dodge's term was presiding over the dedication of a statue of Ethan Allen, which was placed at Burlington's Greenmount Cemetery in July 1873.

In April 1877, Dodge returned to San Francisco, where he was a partner with E. W. Forsaith in the Forsaith & Dodge wholesale mercantile business.  Dodge sold his share of the business in 1882 and moved to Idaho, where he was a partner with his brothers Omri and Nathan in a lumber business that manufactured sashes, doors, and other building materials.  In 1883 the lumber mill, factory, and a large stock of raw lumber, glass, and finished wood products were destroyed by fire.

Dodge returned to San Francisco after losing his Idaho lumber business.  Between 1884 and 1890, he was employed by several businesses, including superintendent of the Coos Bay Stave and Lumber Company and superintendent of Pacific Woodenware and Cooperage.  In March 1890, Dodge was appointed cashier in the office of the U.S. Internal Revenue Collector for San Francisco, a position he held until the late 1890s.  In retirement, he resided with his son in San Rafael, California.

Dodge died at the San Rafael home of his son George on February 3, 1901.  He was buried at Mount Tamalpais Cemetery in San Rafael.

Family
In 1849, Dodge married Lucia Pomeroy Moore (1825-1903) of Burlington.  They were the parents of a son, George Moore Dodge.  George Dodge (1850-1925) was a graduate of the University of Vermont who became a well-known railroad construction engineer and surveyor in California.

References

Sources

Books

Newspapers

Internet

External links

1821 births
1901 deaths
People from Montpelier, Vermont
Businesspeople from San Francisco
Politicians from Burlington, Vermont
Vermont Republicans
19th-century American politicians
Mayors of Burlington, Vermont
Burials in California
19th-century American businesspeople